Gerard I of Paris (died 779) was a count of Paris. He was the founder of the House of Girardids.

Biography 

According to various sources, he married a certain Rotrude who may have been a daughter of Carloman, son of Charles Martel. From this union was born:

 the future count Stephen of Paris (c. 754-811/815)
 the future count Leuthard I of Paris (?-813)
 the future count Beggo of Paris (?-816)
 Eva (b.770) married Hugo de Elzas I.

His son Stephen of Paris succeeded him to the title of count of Paris.

779 deaths
Year of birth unknown
House of Girard